Valavayal is a small town in Wayanad district of Kerala,  the people primarily depend on agriculture for a living.

The town has the Meenangadi-Pulpally road passing through it. The town is near to the Narasipuzha which will later join in Panamaram puzha after that it will known as Kabani. Sulthan Battery is the nearest town which is situated at about 930 metres above mean sea level. One can find beautiful folded hills across the horizon. The climate is pleasant throughout the year.

People
Wayanad district stands first in the case of adivasi population (about 36%) among other districts in the state. There are people from almost all parts of Kerala who migrated to this fertile land for building up their lives.

Climate
Valavayal has a salubrious climate. Lakkidi, Vythiri and Meppadi are the high rainfall areas in Wayanad. Annual rain falls in these high rainfall areas ranges from 3000 to 4000 m.m. High velocity winds are common during the southwest monsoon and dry winds blow in March–April.  High altitude regions experience severe cold. In Wayanad (Ambalavayal) the mean maximum and minimum temperature for the last five years were 29 °C and 18 °C respectively.  This place experiences a high relative humidity, which goes even up to 95 per cent during the Southwest monsoon period. Generally the year is classified in four seasons, namely, cold weather (December–February), hot weather (March–May), Southwest monsoon (June–September)and Northeast monsoon (October–November).

Monthly rainfall

How To reach
Valavayal has a very good road connectivity with other towns. The major road is Meenagadi-Pulapally road.

Local administration
Valavayal is a part of Poothadi panchayath.

Important Landmarks
 Valavayal High School
 Valavaya Library
 Panjayathu ground 
 Vattathany Mahavishnu Temple 
 Valavayal Church
 Papplessery Masjid

Healthcare

Valavayal has
Government Primary Health Center
Government Homeopathic Hospital

Shopping
Stationary and agriculture products.

References
Sulthan Bathery the nearest town.

External links

 http://wayanad.nic.in/
 http://kkd.kerala.gov.in/

Villages in Wayanad district